A referendum on the territory's status was held in Guam on 30 January 1982. Although the option of becoming a US commonwealth received the most votes, it did not achieve a majority. As a result, a second referendum was held in September with only two options.

Results

References

Guam
January status referendum
Referendums in Guam
Guam
Multiple-choice referendums
Guamanian status referendum